Veverská Bítýška is a town in Brno-Country District in the South Moravian Region of the Czech Republic. It has about 3,500 inhabitants.

Geography
It lies on the Svratka River, at its confluence with the Bílý Stream. It lies mostly in the Boskovice Furrow.

History
The first written mention of Veverská Bítýška is from 1376. It was named after the nearby Veveří Castle. In 1521, it was promoted to a market town.

Veverská Bítýška has been given the town status effective 27 August 2018.

Notable people
Marie Kudeříková (1921–1943), resistance fighter; lived here

References

External links

Populated places in Brno-Country District
Cities and towns in the Czech Republic